This is a list of the principal holders of government office during the second premiership of the Marquess of Rockingham for four months in 1782.

The North ministry resigned on 22 March 1782 after losing the confidence of Parliament following the British defeat at the siege of Yorktown during the American War of Independence. Whig Lord Rockingham, Prime Minister from 1765 to 1766, formed a government. The Rockingham Whigs had generally been sympathetic to the cause of the Colonists and under Rockingham the British government began the negotiations leading to the Peace of Paris that concluded the war.

The death of Rockingham on 1 July 1782 caused a split in the ministry. Home Secretary Lord Shelburne was appointed to succeed him but several members of the government refused to serve under him and resigned. These "Portland Whigs" (named after their nominal leader, the Duke of Portland, but in reality led by Charles James Fox) allied in opposition with Lord North and brought down the Shelburne ministry in 1783, coming to power as the Fox–North coalition.

Cabinet
:

Ministers not in Cabinet
 The Lord Grantham – First Lord of Trade
 Isaac Barré – Treasurer of the Navy
 Thomas Townshend – Secretary at War
 Edmund Burke – Paymaster of the Forces
 The Duke of Portland – Lord Lieutenant of Ireland
 Henry Seymour Conway – Commander-in-Chief of the Forces

References

 

1782 establishments in Great Britain
1782 disestablishments in Great Britain
British ministries
Government
Ministries of George III of the United Kingdom
1780s in Great Britain